Sneek is a city southwest of Leeuwarden and the seat of the former municipality of Sneek in the province of Friesland, Netherlands. As of 2011 it is the seat of the municipality of Súdwest-Fryslân (Southwest Friesland). The city had approximately 33,855 inhabitants in January 2017.

Sneek is situated in Southwest Friesland, close to the Sneekermeer, and is well known for its canals, the Waterpoort (Watergate, the symbol of the city), and watersports (hosting the annual Sneekweek, the largest sailing event on inland European waterways). Sneek is one of the Friese elf steden ("Eleven cities of Friesland"). The city is very important in the southwestern part of Friesland (called the Zuidwesthoek, or Southwest Corner).

History

History
Sneek was founded in the 10th century as Chud on a sandy peninsula at the crossing site of a dike with an important waterway (called the Magna Fossa in old documents). This waterway was dug when the former Middelzee silted up. The dike can still be traced in the current street pattern and street names like Hemdijk, Oude Dijk, and Oosterdijk.

Sneek received several city rights in the 13th century, which became official in 1456. Sneek then became one of the eleven Frisian cities. This was also the beginning of a period of blooming trade for the city that would last until about 1550. In 1492 construction of a moat and wall around the city began. In those days Sneek was the only walled city in Friesland. The Waterpoort and the Bolwerk remain today.

Before 2011, the city was an independent municipality.

Sister city Kurobe
Since September 10, 1970, Sneek and the Japanese city of Kurobe have been sister cities. In 1970, Mayor L. Rasterhoff of Sneek visited the city of Kurobe and was named an honorary citizen. Mayor H. Terade of Kurobe made a visit to Sneek in 1972. In 2000 delegations of both cities visited each other again. The Japanese showed the citizens of Sneek a "Sneekplein", which was built in Kurobe.

Language
Sneek has its own dialect (called Snekers) that dates back to the Dutch language before 1600. Snekers is part of the Stadsfries dialects.

Trade and industry
The clothing store C&A started in 1841 with a store in Sneek. The Candyfactory Leaf produces Peppermint under the name  as well as chewing gum (Sportlife) and various other sweets. Sneek also has steel, machinery and rope factories. Since 1964 there is a factory of Yoshida YKK from Kurobe. Besides that, the supermarket branch Poiesz, clothing brand Gaastra and Frisian gin called beerenburg from Weduwe Joustra are products that have their roots in Sneek.

Places of interest
Sneek is well known as the center of watersports with over 130 watersport companies and 13 Marinas. It also has a historic inner city replete with houses of old upper-class families.
 Waterpoort (1613)
 Sneek Town Hall (1550)
 Grote of Martinikerk (Protestant, 1498), with a carillon of 50 bells
 St. Martin's Church (Catholic, 1872)
 Tonnema Candy Factory (1955)
 Dúvelsrak and Krúsrak, wooden bridges across the A7 motorway.

Transport
By road, Sneek is connected to the A7 motorway and N354

Buses and trains in the town are operated by Arriva.

Sneek is connected to other cities by four main waterways: Houkesloot, leading to the Prinses Margrietkanaal; River de Geeuw, leading to IJlst; de Zwette, leading to Leeuwarden; Franekervaart, leading to Franeker.

Art and Culture

Museums
 Fries Scheepvaart Museum Frisian Maritime Museum
 Nationaal Modelspoor Museum National Model Train Museum

Podia
 Het Bolwerk, very first poppodium of Friesland, since 1975. Member of the Fries Popnet.

Cultural Quarter
In 2010 there will be a Cultural Quarter, The municipality has made plans to connect various Cultural areas into one big Cultural Quarter. The total costs of the plans are about €35,000,000 and include
 The Noorderchurch will house a theatre and a Center of the Arts (CvdK - Centrum voor de Kunsten)
 The Bolwerk will house another part of the CvdK
 A new Theatre (Capacity of 600 people) at the location of the former postoffice-building
 The connection between the Theatre and the Bolwerk with a walking bridge and a floating podium in the city canal. This part won't be constructed because of high costs.
 The Public library and the Martinichurch will be linked to the Cultural Quarter

Silver Ball
The Culture Award of Sneek is called The Silver Ball and has been awarded 11 times. The award is given annually to a person that has done an improvement/good job on the areas of Music and Culture for Sneek and its surroundings. Some of the winners are:
 Henk van der Veer, writer
 2005: Maaike Schuurmans, musical actress
 2006: Yede van Dijk, actor
 2007: Bennie Hoogstra, 25 years playing the Drum- & Showkorps Advendo

Events
 Sneekweek, Sailevent on the Sneekermeer
 Swinging Sneek, live-music in cafés and on street

Education
Sneek has eleven primary schools and three high schools.

Sport

Sports centres
 Sportcentrum Schuttersveld
 Sportpark Noorderhoek
 Sportpark SWZ Sneek
 Sportpark Leeuwarderweg
 Swimming pool It Rak
 Zuidersportpark

Sport Clubs
 Sneek Wit Zwart(SWZ), football club
 LSC 1890, one of the oldest football clubs in the Netherlands
 ONS Sneek, football club
 Black Boys, football club
 Waterpoort boys, football club
 Sneeker MHC, hockey club
 VC Sneek, volleyball club
 Neptunia'24, water polo club
 L.T.C. NOMI, tennis club
 White Cats Sneek, baseball and softball club
 FC Gescheurde Knieband, football club

Sportevents
 Elfstedentocht Eleven city ice skating race and tour
 Fietselfstedentocht Eleven city cycling tour

Notable people

 Rienck Bockema (ca. 1350-1436)
 Pier Gerlofs Donia, (ca. 1480 - 1529), Frisian freedom fighter, rebel and pirate 'Grutte Pier'
 Murk van Phelsum (1730–1799), physician
 Nicolaas Molenaar (1850–1930), architect
 Jakob van Schevichaven (1866–1935), detective writer
 Geert Aeilco Wumkes (1869–1954), theologian and historian
 Willem de Sitter (1872–1934), mathematician, physicist and astronomer
 Pieter Sjoerds Gerbrandy (1885–1961), politician
 Frits Wissel (1907–1999), pilot, discoverer of the Wissel Lakes in New-Guinea.
 Klaas Dijkstra (1895 - 1969), advocate of pseudoscience (Flat Earth)
 Kees Deenik (1915–1993), singer, TV producer
 Dieuwkje Nauta (1930–2008), teacher, politician
 Bart Tromp (1944–2007), sociologist
 Joke Tjalsma (1957), actress
 Toon Gerbrands (1957), coach and manager
 Pauline Krikke (1961), politician
 Manon Thomas (1963), television presenter
 Jan Posthuma (1963), international volleyball player
 Ronald Zoodsma (1966), international volleyball player
 Monique Sluyter (1967), model and television star
 Olof van der Meulen (1968), volleyball player
 Sherida Spitse (1990), soccer player
 Wiebe Nijenhuis (died 2016), strongest man of Friesland 1982-1984
 Ida Hoekema Ietje Hinje (1967), Tourist & Venidera in Bergondo (Galiza)
 Nyck De Vries (1995), Racing Driver

Living
Sneek has around 14,000 houses. Half of those houses are rental houses. There are new projects in different neighbourhoods.

Extra Information
In 1519–1520, the Frisian warlord and freedom fighter Pier Gerlofs Donia spent his last days in Sneek. Donia died peacefully in bed at  12 on 18 October 1520. Pier is buried in Sneek in the 15th-century Groote Kerk (also called the Martinikerk). His tomb is located on the north side of the church.

This quaint little city has a shopping center that is walker and biker friendly. There are high-end clothing stores, restaurants, bars, music stores, cafes, coffee shops, and an old-fashioned candy store.

References

External links

 
 Tourism Sneek
 Official website of the Sneekweek sailing event

 
Súdwest-Fryslân
Former municipalities of Friesland
Populated places in Friesland
Cities in Friesland
Cities in the Netherlands
Municipalities of the Netherlands disestablished in 2011